Beenkeragh or Benkeeragh is the second-highest peak in Ireland, at , on both the Arderin and Vandeleur-Lynam lists. It is part of the MacGillycuddy's Reeks range in County Kerry. Beenkeragh also gives its name the infamous Beenkeragh Ridge, the narrow rocky arete between Beenkeragh and Carrauntoohil, Ireland's highest mountain.

Geography 

Beenkeragh lies to the north of Carrauntoohil ., and is part of the MacGillycuddy's Reeks range in County Kerry. Beenkeragh is joined to Carrauntoohil by a very narrow rocky ridge, or arete, known as the Beenkeragh Ridge. In the middle of the Beenkeragh Ridge is another other summit called, The Bones .

Beenkeragh is the 179th-highest mountain in Britain and Ireland on the Simm classification.   Beenkeragh is regarded by the Scottish Mountaineering Club ("SMC") as one of 34 Furths, which is a mountain above  in elevation, and meets the other SMC criteria for a Munro (e.g. "sufficient separation"), but which is outside of (or furth) Scotland; which is why Beenkeragh is sometimes referred to as one of the 13 Irish Munros.  

Beenkeragh's prominence qualifies it to meet the Arderin classification, and the British Isles Simm and Hewitt classifications.

Climbing

The Beenkeragh Ridge is considered as offering some of Ireland's "most intimidating" hill-walking, and is often climbed as part of the Coomloughra Horseshoe, described as "one of Ireland's finest ridge-walks". The horseshoe takes in Ireland's three highest mountains, Carrauntoohil, Beenkeragh, and Caher.

Beenkeragh is also accessed from the south-east via the Hag's Glen by ascending the Hag's Tooth , and continuing up the steep and rocky Hag's Tooth Ridge to the summit of Beenkeragh.  The route gives views into the deep corrie at the base of Carrauntoohil's north-east face, known as the Eagle's Nest area. The Eagle's Nest corrie consists of three levels, with the top level (or third level), containing Lough Cummeenoughter, Ireland's highest lake. On summiting Beenkeragh, the route crosses the Beenkeragh Ridge to Carrauntoohil and descends via the Heavenly Gates path across the east-face of Carrauntoohil.

See also 

 Lists of mountains in Ireland
 List of mountains of the British Isles by height
 List of Furth mountains in the British Isles

References

External links
MountainViews: The Irish Mountain Website, Beenkeragh
MountainViews: Irish Online Mountain Database
The Database of British and Irish Hills , the largest database of British Isles mountains ("DoBIH")
Hill Bagging UK & Ireland, the searchable interface for the DoBIH
Logainm: Placenames Database of Ireland

Mountains and hills of County Kerry
Furths
One-thousanders of Ireland